Geum clan of Bonghwa is one of the Korean clans. Their Bon-gwan is in Bonghwa County, North Gyeongsang Province. According to the research held in 2015, the number of Geum clan of Bonghwa was 23301. Geum clan began when Geum Eung founded Gija Joseon with Gija after Gija conquered Korea. Their founder was  who worked as High Merit Minister in Goryeo.

See also 
 Korean clan names of foreign origin

References

External links 
 

 
Korean clan names of Chinese origin